These are the results of the women's individual all-around competition, one of six events for female competitors in artistic gymnastics at the 1972 Summer Olympics in Munich.  The qualification and final rounds took place on August 27, 28 and 30th at the Sports Hall. This was the first time that the all-around was contested on a separate day from the team final; previously, the gymnasts' scores during the compulsory and optional rounds of team competition would determine the all-around winner.

Results

Qualification
One-hundred eighteen gymnasts competed in the compulsory and optional rounds on August 27 and 28.  The thirty-six highest scoring gymnasts advanced to the final on August 30.  There was no limit as to how many competitors each country could have in the final.  Half of the points earned by each gymnast during both the compulsory and optional rounds carried over to the final.  This constitutes each gymnast's "prelim" score.

Final

Remaining placings

References

External links
Official Olympic Report
www.gymnasticsresults.com
www.gymn-forum.net

Women's individual all-around
1972 in women's gymnastics
Women's events at the 1972 Summer Olympics